Evy Gunilla Palm (born January 31, 1942 in Lidköping, Västra Götaland) is a female athlete from Sweden, who competes in the long-distance events. She represented her native country at the 1988 Summer Olympics, finishing in 24th place in the women's marathon at the age of 46. In the lead up to the Olympics, she set the current Masters W45 World Record in the 10,000 metres.  Palm is a three-time winner of the Stockholm Marathon.

She won the City-Pier-City Loop half marathon in the Hague in 1988.

Records
Her Swedish half marathon records:

 44 years 1.12.11 Evy Palm Mölndals AIK 31jan42 Gothenburg 86-05-10
 46 " 1.11.18 Evy Palm Mölndals AIK 31jan42 Östnor 88-07-16 VSM
 48 " 1.16.23 Evy Palm Mölndals AIK 31jan42 Skellefteå 90-07-14 VSM
 49 " 1.12.36 Evy Palm Mölndals AIK 31jan42 Haag HOL 91-03-24
 55 " 1.25.08 Evy Palm Mölndals AIK 31jan42 Gothenburg 97-05-24
 56 " 1.27.37 Evy Palm Mölndals AIK 31jan42 Gothenburg 98-05-16

Her Swedish marathon records:

 44 years 2.32.47 Evy Palm Mölndals AIK 31jan42 Boston USA 86-04-21
 45 " 2.35.14 Evy Palm Mölndals AIK 31jan42 Stockholm 87-05-30
 46 " 2.31.35 Evy Palm Mölndals AIK 31jan42 London GBR 88-04-17
 47 " 2.31.05 Evy Palm Mölndals AIK 31jan42 London GBR 89-04-23
 48 " 2.38.00 Evy Palm Mölndals AIK 31jan42 New York USA 90-11-04
 55 " 3.05.39 Evy Palm Mölndals AIK 31jan42 Stockholm 97-06-07 SM
 56 " 3.04.27 Evy Palm Mölndals AIK 31jan42 Stockholm 98-06-07 SM
 61 " 3.24.52N Evy Palm Mölndals AIK 31jan42 Stockholm 03-06-14

Achievements

References

1942 births
Living people
Swedish female long-distance runners
Swedish female marathon runners
Athletes (track and field) at the 1988 Summer Olympics
Olympic athletes of Sweden
Swedish masters athletes
World record holders in masters athletics
People from Lidköping Municipality
Sportspeople from Västra Götaland County